Silvio Luiz may refer to:

 Silvio Luiz (commentator) (born 1934), Brazilian commentator and presenter
 Silvio Luiz (footballer) (born 1977), Brazilian footballer